Nyassachromis purpurans is a species of cichlid endemic to Lake Malawi where it prefers areas with sandy substrates.  This species can reach a length of  TL.  It can also be found in the aquarium trade.

Included in the group of open water mouthbrooders called "Utaka" by the native Malawians, the male is a light iridescent blue with ornate yellow fins tipped with a black stripe while the female is a drab silver-gray with yellow-tipped fins.

References

Fish of Lake Malawi
Fish of Malawi
purpurans
Fish described in 1935
Taxonomy articles created by Polbot